Play School was a New Zealand educational television show for children. It was based on the British Play School show. The series first aired in 1972, and ended in 1990.

Synopsis 
Play School was first broadcast in New Zealand on Tuesday 22 March 1972 for a 26-week trial period, with a group of six hosts chosen, one pair for each week. Series one and two continued to be broadcast twice weekly, Tuesday and Thursday at approx. 4.30pm. Its first producer was David Istance, an ex-BBC TV Floor Manager, who had worked on Play School, as well as comedies Gas and Gaiters and Hugh and I during the 1960s.  He later returned to the UK and worked as a Production Assistant on Juliet Bravo (1980) and then as a Production Manager on Bergerac, Juliet Bravo, All Creatures Great and Small (1983), Malestrom and Tenko Reunion (1985) and in the mid-80s worked at BBC TV Training at Elstree Studios.

It was originally filmed at AKTV2's Shortland Street studios in Auckland, and in January 1975 moved to TVNZ's Dunedin Studio being screened twice a day at around 10am and then 2:30pm.  For a brief period in 1986, the programme was filmed in Christchurch.  The final edition, recorded in March 1989 was number 440, presented by Pauline Durning and John Mann.  The last series screened on television in 1990.

The show was provided by the BBC in "kitset" form. They supplied scripts and also short filmed items for showing "through the windows".

The show starred five toys, which are famously nostalgic for New Zealanders who watched the programme as children.  They are:
Big Ted: A traditional-style golden coloured teddy bear
Little Ted: Identical to Big Ted, but much smaller
Manu: A very human-looking plastic doll with Māori features, such as dark skin and hair
Jemima: A rag doll with orange woollen hair
Humpty: A round green fabric toy resembling Humpty Dumpty.

Today, Big Ted, Manu, Jemima, and Humpty are part of a collection at the Museum of New Zealand Te Papa Tongarewa in Wellington, New Zealand. The museum also has a large collection of clothing and props from the show. Little Ted's head was blown from his body by the film crew after the completion of the final series. The body can be seen at the Otago Settlers Museum in Dunedin while the head remains in private ownership.
The original clock from the series was discovered at a library in Invercargill in August 2009.

In 2005, TV2 started to screen the Australian version of Play School. It features New Zealand presenter Jay Laga'aia who has been on the show since 2000, though the Australian version is significantly different from the New Zealand version, which was similar to the British format of the seventies and eighties.

Cast

The founding presenters were Waric Slyfield and Janet (née Chaafe) Milne.  They presented most of the programmes made in the first year of production (1972), with some presented by Ken Rea and Val Lamond.  Waric and Janet were joined the following year by Jan Johnstone, Ray Woolf and Elizabeth Rogers.

Pianists included Ossie Cheesman.

Other presenters were:

 Wayne/Gabriel Alston (1975-76)
 Timothy Bartlett (1987-89)
 Janine Barry (1975-77)
 Dallas Beckett
 Grant Bridger
 Jeremy Brownbrook (née Brookes)
 Winsome Dacker Aroha (1980-82)
 Jacqui Dean (née Hay)
 Barry Dorking (1976-82)
 Pauline Durning (née Nitis-Cooper) (1975-78; 1982; 1987-3/89)
 Ray Edkins/Steven Ray
 Deb Faith
 Nick Farra (1988)
 Kristen Gillespie (1986-88)
 Doris Gieson (1975-76)
 Theresa Healey
 Campbell Hegan (1974-76)
 Ian Kingsford-Smith 
 Laugharne (née Stockham)Laughananda (1975-76)
 Kerry McCammon (1986)
 Michael McGrath (1976)
 John Mann (1987-89)
 Shaquelle Maybury
 Eilish (née Moran) Wahren (1986) 
 Margot Nash (1975)
 Jayashree Panjabi (1980-81)
 Rawiri Paratene (1980-82)
 Katy Platt (1975-76)
 Kathryn Rawlings (1975-77)
 Mike Rehu
 Tania Robins (1987)
 Russell Smith (1987)
 Ian Taylor
 Marcus Turner
 Peter Verstappen
 Greg Wells

Musicians
 Russell Sheppard
 Ian (Eli) Gray-Smith
 Neville Copeland
 Graeme Perkins
 Murray Wood (deceased in CTV building, Canterbury Earthquake)

See also
Play School (Australian TV series)
Play School (UK TV series)
 Polka Dot Door
 Playdays
 Play Away
 Tikkabilla
 Zoom
 Mister Rogers' Neighborhood
 Captain Kangaroo
 Sesame Street

References

External links 
 Play School on IMDb
Play School at TV2

New Zealand children's television series
1970s preschool education television series
1980s preschool education television series
1990s preschool education television series
1970s New Zealand television series
1980s New Zealand television series
1990s New Zealand television series
TVNZ original programming
1972 New Zealand television series debuts
1990 New Zealand television series endings
English-language television shows
Sentient toys in fiction